The list below shows the leading sire of broodmares in Japan for each year since 1974. This is determined by the amount of prize money won in a race held by the JRA during the year in Japan by racehorses that were foaled by a daughter of the sire in question.

 1974 - Hindostan (1)
 1975 - Hindostan (2)
 1976 - Hindostan (3)
 1977 - Tosa Midori (1)
 1978 - Hindostan (4)
 1979 - China Rock (1)
 1980 - China Rock (2)
 1981 - China Rock (3)
 1982 - China Rock (4)
 1983 - China Rock (5)
 1984 - Never Beat (1)
 1985 - China Rock (6)
 1986 - Never Beat (2)
 1987 - Partholon (1)
 1988 - Never Beat (3)
 1989 - Partholon (2)
 1990 - Northern Taste (1) (Faberge if NAR earnings are included)
 1991 - Northern Taste (2)
 1992 - Northern Taste (3)
 1993 - Northern Taste (4)
 1994 - Northern Taste (5)
 1995 - Northern Taste (6)
 1996 - Northern Taste (7)
 1997 - Northern Taste (8)
 1998 - Northern Taste (9)
 1999 - Northern Taste (10)
 2000 - Northern Taste (11)
 2001 - Northern Taste (12)
 2002 - Northern Taste (13)
 2003 - Northern Taste (14)
 2004 - Northern Taste (15)
 2005 - Northern Taste (16)
 2006 - Northern Taste (17)
 2007 - Sunday Silence (1)
 2008 - Sunday Silence (2)
 2009 - Sunday Silence (3)
 2010 - Sunday Silence (4)
 2011 - Sunday Silence (5)
 2012 - Sunday Silence (6)
 2013 - Sunday Silence (7)
 2014 - Sunday Silence (8)
 2015 - Sunday Silence (9)
 2016 - Sunday Silence (10)
 2017 - Sunday Silence (11)
 2018 - Sunday Silence (12)
 2019 - Sunday Silence (13)
 2020 - King Kamehameha (1)
 2021 - King Kamehameha (2)
 2022 - King Kamehameha (3)

References 

 JBIS Ranking

See also 

 Leading sire in Australia
 Leading sire in France
 Leading sire in Germany
 Leading sire in Great Britain & Ireland
 Leading sire in Japan
 Leading sire in North America
 Leading broodmare sire in North America

Horse racing in Japan